

Carl Wagener (23 December 1901 – 3 June 1988) was a general in the Wehrmacht of Nazi Germany during World War II. He was a recipient of the Knight's Cross of the Iron Cross.

Awards and decorations

 Knight's Cross of the Iron Cross on 14 May 1944 as Oberst i.G. and Chef der Generalstab of 1.Panzerarmee

References

Citations

Bibliography

 

1901 births
1988 deaths
People from Rybnik County
People from the Province of Silesia
Major generals of the German Army (Wehrmacht)
Reichswehr personnel
Recipients of the Gold German Cross
Recipients of the Knight's Cross of the Iron Cross